Constanța South Container Terminal (CSCT) is located in the Port of Constanţa,  from the Bosphorus Strait and  from Romania's capital Bucharest. It is the largest container terminal in the Black Sea area having an annual traffic capacity of 1,500,000 twenty-foot equivalent unit (TEUs). Located on a plot of land of  the terminal has an additional  for expansion that would increase the traffic up to 4,500,000 TEUs. The container terminal is currently under expansion as of August 2009. After the expansion the terminal will be capable of handling around 1,700,000 TEUs. The terminal is owned by the Dubai based company Dubai Ports World.

Terminal facilities

References

External links 
CSCT Constanţa South Container Terminal official site
Terminal info at DP World homepage

Shipping companies of Romania
Water transport in Romania
Ports and harbours of Romania
Transport companies established in 2004
Container terminals
Companies based in Constanța